Therapy for a Vampire (German: Therapie für einen Vampir) is a 2014 Austrian comedy horror film. It was written and directed by David Ruehm.

Plot

In 1932 Vienna, Austria, Professor Sigmund Freud begins providing psychological therapy to Count Geza Von Kösznöm, a depressed vampire who is unhappy with his centuries long marriage. Von Kösznöm's wife, Countess Elsa Von Kösznöm, is also a vampire and longs to admire herself but is unable to view herself in a mirror or have a portrait of herself painted. Freud offers his assistant, Viktor, to attempt to paint her portrait.

The Count observes Lucy, Viktor's girlfriend, recognizing her as a reincarnation of his first love Nadilla, a woman executed centuries ago. Geza attempts to seduce Lucy only to be interrupted by his wife. The next evening Elsa visits and hires Viktor to paint her portrait. Geza once again tries to cast a spell upon Lucy in order to bring back Nadilla but is discovered by Elsa, who bites Lucy but is chased away before she can kill her (anyone fed off of by a vampire transforms into one themselves unless their heart is removed from their body). Lucy starts transforming into a vampire. Ignaz, Geza's assistant, who is smitten with Lucy, kidnaps and performs a blood transfusion on her, allegedly stopping the transformation process. While trying to attack Geza, Else impales herself with a wooden stake and turns into dust. Geza breaks a fang attempting to bite Lucy through a Byzantine neck-piece. He flies off as a bat as Lucy falls to the ground, caught by Viktor. In the end it is revealed that the blood transfusions only temporarily restored her humanity as she is still a vampire. Freud has also develops minor vampiric abilities due to Lucy accidentally biting him earlier in the film while she was still going through the transformation into a vampire.

Cast

Release
The film premiered at the 2014 Zurich Film Festival. It had an Austrian theatrical release on 19 December 2014.

Reception
Rotten Tomatoes, a review aggregator, reports a 63% approval rating based on 30 reviews and a rating average of 6.2 out of 10.

The film won the Audience Award for Best Foreign Feature at the 2015 Fantasia International Film Festival. At the 2016 Austrian Film Awards, Karl Fischer received a nomination for Best Supporting Actor, Monika Buttinger for costumes, and Sam Dopona for makeup.

References

External links

2014 comedy horror films
Austrian comedy horror films
Swiss comedy horror films
Swiss German-language films
Films set in 1932
Films set in Vienna
Vampire comedy films
2010s German-language films